Fort Nelson may refer to:

Canada
Fort Nelson, British Columbia, a town
Fort Nelson River, British Columbia
Fort Nelson (Manitoba) (1670–1713), an early fur trading post at the mouth of the Nelson River and the first headquarters of the Hudson's Bay Company

United Kingdom
Fort Nelson, Hampshire, England (built 1860–1867), a Palmerston Fort and present-day museum

United States
Fort Nelson (Kentucky), built in 1781
Fort Nelson (Virginia), first constructed in 1776

See also
Camp Nelson (disambiguation)